Helsingborg Municipality (Helsingborgs kommun) is a municipality in Scania County in Sweden. Its seat is located in the city of Helsingborg, which is Sweden's eighth largest city. The municipality had a population of 
147,734 on January 1, 2019, and the metro has about 320,000 inhabitants.

Between 1912 and 1971 the name of the town was officially spelled Hälsingborg (rather like the region of Hälsingland but unlike neighbouring Danish Helsingør and the Finnish capital Helsingfors (Helsinki)). The spelling was changed back to the older version when the present municipality was created in 1971 through the amalgamation of the Town of Hälsingborg with four surrounding rural municipalities. Since the 1990s the municipality again styles itself Helsingborgs stad (Town of Helsingborg). This usage is only nominal and has no effect on the status of the municipality.

Localities

As of 2018, there were 16 urban areas the municipality.

International relations

Twin towns — sister cities
Helsingborg is twinned with:
 Alexandria, United States
 Dubrovnik, Croatia

 Liepāja, Latvia
 Pärnu, Estonia

See also
 Municipalities of Sweden
 European route E4

References
Statistics Sweden

External links

Helsingborg Municipality - Official site
The local daily newspaper

 
Municipalities of Skåne County
Scania